SCPA may refer to:

 San Diego School of Creative and Performing Arts, a school in San Diego, California
 School for Creative and Performing Arts, a school in Cincinnati, Ohio
 Semiconductor Chip Protection Act of 1984
 South Carolina Ports Authority
 Space Canine Patrol Agents,  fictional canine superheroes in DC Comics
 C5a peptidase, an enzyme

See also
School of Creative and Performing Arts (disambiguation)